Scott Michael Fusco (born January 21, 1963) is an American former ice hockey player. Fusco attended Belmont Hill School before going to Harvard. In college, Fusco won the Hobey Baker Award in 1986. He was also a member of the American 1984 Winter Olympics ice hockey team. He was inducted into the United States Hockey Hall of Fame in 2002 and is assistant coach of the Irish national hockey team. His older brother Mark is also a hockey player of note.

Career statistics

Regular season and playoffs

International

Awards and honors

References

External links
 United States Hockey Hall of Fame bio
 

1963 births
American men's ice hockey centers
EHC Olten players
Harvard Crimson men's ice hockey players
Hobey Baker Award winners
Ice hockey players from Massachusetts
Ice hockey players at the 1984 Winter Olympics
Ice hockey players at the 1988 Winter Olympics
Living people
New Jersey Devils draft picks
Olympic ice hockey players of the United States
People from Burlington, Massachusetts
Sportspeople from Middlesex County, Massachusetts
United States Hockey Hall of Fame inductees
Belmont Hill School alumni
AHCA Division I men's ice hockey All-Americans